The 2009 Triton Oil scandal involved the unauthorized release of oil by Kenya Pipeline Company (KPC) without informing financiers. This oil scandal became public in January 2009.

The release of the oil occurred in 2008 when Triton Oil Company was allowed by KPC to withdraw oil amounting to KSh.7.6 billion/= or (US$98.7 million). The company collapsed shortly afterward, withdrawing the oil and selling it to the market.

Triton Oil was owned by Yagnesh Devani. Kenya has issued a warrant to arrest him, but as of January 2010 he was at large and believed to be in hiding abroad.

References

Politics of Kenya
Triton Oil Scandal
Triton Oil Scandal
Law of Kenya
Corruption in Kenya